Hellspawn is  an American comic book series published by Image Comics. Inspired by Spawn, Hellspawn is darker and more atmospheric than the former, and frequently deals with disturbing subject matter. It originally featured writer Brian Michael Bendis and artist Ashley Wood.

The first issue of Hellspawn was published in August 2000. Steve Niles occasionally supplemented the writing and Ben Templesmith the same for the art. With issue #11 Niles and Templesmith took over as the comic's regular writer/artist team. The final issue was published in April 2003.

External links
Spawn.com, Hellspawn comic official page
SpawnWorld, listing of Spawn related comic series

Image Comics titles
Spawn (comics)
Horror comics
Comics by Steve Niles